Kaye H Lovatt is a former British swimmer.

Swimming career
Lovatt competed at the 1980 Summer Olympics in Moscow and gained a fourth place finish in the women's 4 × 100 metres freestyle relay. She was part of the British International swimming team from 1978 until 1982 and the University of Arkansas.

She represented England and won a silver medal in the 4 × 100 metres freestyle relay, at the 1978 Commonwealth Games in Edmonton, Alberta, Canada.

References

1964 births
Living people
British female swimmers
Olympic swimmers of Great Britain
Swimmers at the 1980 Summer Olympics
Swimmers at the 1978 Commonwealth Games
Commonwealth Games medallists in swimming
Commonwealth Games silver medallists for England
Medallists at the 1978 Commonwealth Games